Duckenfield may refer to:

Byron Duckenfield (1917–2010), English Royal Air Force officer
David Duckenfield (born 1944), Police Chief Superintendent with a key involvement in the Hillsborough disaster
Robert Duckenfield (1619–1689), English Parliamentarian commander 
Duckenfield, Jamaica, a settlement
Duckenfield, New South Wales, a place in Australia
Duckenfield (ship), three merchant ships

See also
Dukinfield, a town in England